HMS Coreopsis was an  sloop and Q-ship of the Royal Navy, built at the yards of Barclay Curle on Clydeside and launched on 15 September 1917. Employed as a decoy ship with concealed armament, she served with the Grand Fleet or in the Mediterranean operating from Gibraltar under the false names Beardsley and Bigott. After the end of the First World War, she was laid up before being sold for breaking on 6 September 1922, but did not arrive at Thos. W. Ward's yard in Preston, Lancashire until 5 May 1924.

HMS Coreopsis is sometimes confused with HM Drifter Coreopsis II, which is credited with sinking the German submarine  on 30 April 1918.

References

1917 ships
Ships built on the River Clyde
Anchusa-class sloops
World War I sloops of the United Kingdom
Q-ships of the Royal Navy